Vice-Admiral Philip Durell (1707 – 26 August 1766) was a Royal Navy officer who went on to be Port Admiral at Plymouth.

Naval career
Durell joined the Royal Navy as an ordinary seaman in 1721. In 1745 he took part in the successful Siege of Louisbourg during the War of the Austrian Succession.

Becoming captain of  he was part of Vice-Admiral John Byng's fleet which engaged the French at the Battle of Minorca. The admiral's flagship nearly rear-ended Trident when Durell ordered the top mainsails aback in an attempt to cover HMS Intrepid which was, at that time, severely damaged. According to Dudley Pope, it was Durell who disobeyed the fighting instructions to keep to the battle line. Promoted to commodore in January 1758, he took part in the Siege of Louisbourg in June and July 1758 and subsequent capture of the Fortress of Louisbourg in July 1758. Then in September 1759 he took part in the capture of Quebec.

He became Port Admiral at Plymouth in June 1761. In 1766 he was named Commander-in-Chief of the North American Station but died within days of his arrival in North America.

He is buried in St Paul's Church in Halifax.

References

1707 births
1766 deaths
Royal Navy vice admirals